-o may refer to:

 the -o affix found in English and many other languages.
 Macron (diacritic)